The Maria Fire was a wildfire that burned the south of the community of Santa Paula in the area of Somis, California on the top of South Mountain in Ventura County. The fire ignited in the evening hours of Thursday, October 31, 2019 and consumed well over  within its first several hours of burning. Despite the aggressive initial attack by first responders, the fire exploded rapidly due to a strong Santa Ana wind event that was occurring in the area during its ignition.

Events
On the eve of Thursday, October 31, at 6:13 pm, the Maria fire was reported burning at the top of South Mountain between Santa Paula and Somis and was seen making an aggressive run southwest towards the community of Somis as the fire expanded throughout that evening. The fire worked its way north towards Santa Paula in the Santa Clara River Valley, whose topography can serve as a wind tunnel for Santa Ana winds. Mandatory evacuations were ordered for a wide swath of over 1,800 homes surrounding the fire area, affecting over 7,500 residents. 

Shortly before 11 pm, a drone had been reported flying over the fireline which immediately caused the suspension and grounding of all nighttime water-dropping helicopters that were currently fighting the fire.  This hazard then allowed the incident to continue its critical rate of spread virtually unchecked. By 11:45 pm, the fire had reportedly grown to 7,400 acres with zero containment as the fire progressed predominantly westward.

During the day of November 1, three different DC-10 air tankers contracted to the US Forest Service (910, 911 and 914) and flying from Santa Maria and San Bernardino airports made multiple runs on the Maria Fire, along with helicopters including an Erickson Skycrane.

Fire growth and containment progress 

Initial inquiries into the cause or origin of the Maria fire revealed that Southern California Edison (SCE), the power utility operating in the area, had re-energized 16,000 volt transmission lines in the vicinity roughly 13 minutes before first reports of the fire were received. The lines were de-energized beforehand specifically to avoid the possibility of its power lines causing fires due to the high winds in the area. SCE issued a statement indicating that it had no specific information on the cause of the fire and that it would "cooperate with the appropriate investigative agencies if asked to do so." The final report issued in October 2020 on the cause of the fire cited a combination of extreme wind conditions and a power line owned by California Resources Corporation that touched a metal pipe on the ground after an electrical conductor separated.

See also
 2019 California wildfires

References

2019 California wildfires
October 2019 events in the United States
Wildfires in Ventura County, California